Tannensee is a reservoir in Obwalden, Switzerland. In 1958, Tannenbach and few other creeks were dammed with an earth-fill dam. The reservoir is used to generate electricity at Kraftwerk Hugschwendi in Kerns.

See also
List of lakes of Switzerland
List of mountain lakes of Switzerland

External links
Swiss dams: Tannensee
Kraftwerk Hugschwendi 

Reservoirs in Switzerland
Lakes of Obwalden
RTannensee
Kerns, Switzerland